Robbie Turner is the stage name of Jeremy Baird, an American drag queen and writer most known for competing on the eighth season of RuPaul's Drag Race.

Early life
Baird was raised by Pentecostal ministers in Centralia, Washington.

Career
Early in her career, Turner performed at Tacoma, Washington's pride festival. In Seattle, she performed at the bar R Place, as and hosted the Robbie Turner Revue at the Hard Rock Café.

Turner auditioned for RuPaul's Drag Race multiple times before being cast for the eighth season. Fellow Seattle performer Jinkx Monsoon endorsed Turner in the submitted audition tape. During the "Snatch Game" competition, Turner portrayed Diana Vreeland. Turner was eliminated from Drag Race after losing a lip sync battle to Derrick Barry. Vulture ranked Turner number 53 on their list of "Every Snatch Game Impersonation on RuPaul's Drag Race, Ranked". The Independent Lily Pearson included Turner's lip sync against Cynthia Lee Fontaine in her list of "the most unmissable moments" in Drag Race history. In 2018, Instinct ranked Turner number 80 in the article, "The Definitive List: Ranking All the RuPaul's Drag Race Queens from 1 to 126", and Stephen Daw of Billboard ranked Les Chicken Wings (a group composed of Turner, Kim Chi, and Naomi Smalls) number 18 on his list of the "50 Best Musical Moments" on the show.

Turner has appeared on the web series "Capitol Hill" with BenDeLaCreme. She appeared on Hey Qween in 2017. Turner wrote the book, I'll Tell You for Free.

In addition to performing at Seattle's Queer/Bar, Turner has served as the bar's entertainment producer. Turner took a "personal leave" in 2018.

Personal life
Turner lived in Seattle's Capitol Hill neighborhood, as of 2016.

In April 2018, Turner claimed to be involved in a fatal Uber accident. She later admitted the accident did not happen, after media outlets noted inconsistencies with her story.

Filmography

Television

Web series

See also
 LGBT culture in Seattle

References

1980s births
Living people
American drag queens
American writers
People from Centralia, Washington
People from Seattle
Robbie Turner